T. S. Ramaswami Pillai   (8 June 1918 – 15 June 2006) was an Indian politician, freedom fighter and former Member of the Legislative Assembly. He was elected to the Travancore-Cochin assembly from Thovalai Agastheeswaram constituency in 1952 election as an Indian National Congress candidate. Thovalai Agastheeswaram was a two-member constituency and the other winner was A. Samraj from the same party.

He won the 1954 election again as a Praja Socialist Party candidate from Thovalai constituency. He was elected to Tamil Nadu legislative assembly as an Independent candidate from Kanyakumari constituency in 1957 election.

References 

1918 births
2006 deaths
People from Kanyakumari district
Indian National Congress politicians from Tamil Nadu
Praja Socialist Party politicians
Travancore–Cochin MLAs 1952–1954
Travancore–Cochin MLAs 1954–1956
Madras MLAs 1952–1957